Boiled Beef & Rotting Teeth is the second EP by the Seattle grunge band Mudhoney. It was released in England in 1989 and contains the band's first two singles –"Touch Me I'm Sick" and "You Got It"– along with the b-sides of each. The song "Hate the Police" would also be released as a single. The songs on this EP were later included on the compilation album Superfuzz Bigmuff Plus Early Singles (1990).

Track listing
 "Hate the Police" (The Dicks) – 2:08
 "Touch Me I'm Sick" – 2:35
 "Sweet Young Thing Ain't Sweet No More" – 3:46
 "You Got It (Keep It Outta My Face)" – 2:53 
 "Burn It Clean" – 3:00

Personnel
 Mark Arm - electric guitar, vocals
 Steve Turner - guitar, backing vocals
 Matt Lukin - bass guitar
 Dan Peters - drums
 Jack Endino - engineering

1989 EPs
Mudhoney albums
Grunge EPs
Sub Pop EPs